On 14 October 2022, an explosion occurred in Amasra coal mine in Amasra, Bartın Province, Turkey, killing 42 people and injuring 27. It was one of the deadliest industrial incidents in Turkey.

Explosion 
The explosion occurred at 6:30 p.m. Turkish time, at a depth of about 300 metres. Some reports stated that five people were working under  and 44 people were working under .  

Minister of the Interior Süleyman Soylu said that more than 22 people had died and 28 people crawled out on their own. Minister of Health Fahrettin Koca said that 11 people had been pulled out alive and were being treated in hospital. 58 miners were saved.

Investigation 

The cause of the blast is yet unknown and is under investigation, with firedamp (possibly coalbed methane) being one suspected cause.

Response
President Recep Tayyip Erdoğan wrote on Twitter that he was closely monitoring the situation and said that search and rescue operations were progressing rapidly at the mine. Erdoğan canceled a planned trip to Diyarbakır and instead traveled to Amasra on 15 October. Erdoğan's comments linking the explosion to "the plan of destiny" and saying that such explosions "will always be" drew criticism from opposition leader Kemal Kılıçdaroğlu, as well as protests in Istanbul.

See also

Coal in Turkey

References

2022 disasters in Turkey
2022 mining disasters
Mine explosion
Coal mining disasters in Turkey
Explosions in 2022
Explosions in Turkey
History of Bartın Province
October 2022 events in Asia